"Little Wonders" is a song by American singer-songwriter Rob Thomas, recorded for Disney's animated feature Meet the Robinsons in 2007. It is the second single from the Meet the Robinsons soundtrack. It is featured on the film's soundtrack and in the ending of the film itself, and has been released as a single. "Little Wonders" debuted on the US Billboard Hot 100 at number 78 and subsequently peaked at number 58. The song also became a top-20 hit in Australia, Austria, and Germany.

Background 
Rob Thomas revealed on April 1, 2017, via his Facebook page, that the song 'Little Wonders' was written about him and his wife Marisol's first dog Tyler, who was born on that same date.

Music video
Two different versions of this video have been released, both of which contain various live action references to scenes in Meet the Robinsons.

Synopsis
The original version features Thomas set against various backdrops, most of which feature crowded scenes. It starts out with Thomas in a rainy day in a city, singing the song under an umbrella (a reference to the film's rainy opening). The camera pans out at the chorus to show various people in the city. The next verse begins with Thomas on a rooftop in the city (a reference to the building rooftop which the film's protagonist, Lewis, spent much time on and various important events of the film take place on), playing an acoustic guitar while singing, and at the second chorus, the camera again pans out to show window views of various people engaging in different activities. The bridge shows Thomas at a kids' softball game (a reference to Goob, Lewis's roommate at the orphanage who revolves around baseball and is a little league baseball player). A kid hits a home run ball, which carries onto a beach, and in front of a house on the coast of the beach, Thomas sings the last of the song while people play around on the beach.

It ends with Thomas walking off the beach into the sunset.

The second version is essentially the same, but with additional footage from Meet the Robinsons spliced in. Both versions were directed by Dave Meyers.

Track listing
 "Little Wonders" (radio edit) – 3:45
 "There's a Great Big Beautiful Tomorrow" – 1:59 (performed by They Might Be Giants)
 "From the Past to the Future" – 2:38 (performed by Danny Elfman)

Charts

Weekly charts

Year-end charts

Sales and certifications

References

2007 singles
2007 songs
Atlantic Records singles
Disney songs
Meet the Robinsons
Rob Thomas (musician) songs
Songs written by Rob Thomas (musician)
Songs written for animated films
Walt Disney Records singles